Karl Stuart Nelson  (born June 14, 1960) is a former American football offensive tackle who played professionally in the National Football League (NFL) for the New York Giants.  He was a member of the 1986 Giants team that won Super Bowl XXI.  He missed the 1987 season due to Hodgkin's disease.  Nelson played college football at Iowa State University.  He also served as a commentator on Giants radio broadcasts.

Nelson currently resides with his wife, Inga, in Northern New Jersey where he works in the financial industry, and is an active advocate for various charities. His primary charity is Adopt-a-Soldier Platoon.

See also
 History of the New York Giants (1979–93)

References

1960 births
Living people
American football offensive tackles
Iowa State Cyclones football players
National Football League announcers
New York Giants announcers
New York Giants players
People from DeKalb, Illinois
Ed Block Courage Award recipients